Below are the squads for the 1966 FIFA World Cup final tournament in England. Spain (3), West Germany (3) and France (2) had players representing foreign clubs.

Group 1

England
Head coach: Alf Ramsey

France

Head coach: Henri Guérin

Mexico

Head coach: Ignacio Tréllez

Uruguay

Head coach: Ondino Viera

Group 2

Argentina

Head coach: Juan Carlos Lorenzo

Spain

Head coach: José Villalonga

Switzerland

Head coach:  Alfredo Foni

West Germany

Head coach: Helmut Schön

Group 3

Brazil

Head coach: Vicente Feola

Bulgaria

Head coach:  Rudolf Vytlačil

Hungary

Head coach: Lajos Baróti

Portugal

Head coach:  Otto Glória

Group 4

Chile

Head coach: Luis Álamos

Italy

Head coach: Edmondo Fabbri

North Korea
Source: FIFA

Head coach: Myung Rye-hyun

Note: , only seven players of North Korean team are surviving. See: The Game of Their Lives

Soviet Union

Head coach: Nikolai Morozov

Notes
Each national team had to submit a squad of 22 players. All the teams included 3 goalkeepers, except Brazil, Chile and North Korea who only called two.

References

 Planet World Cup website
 weltfussball.de 

FIFA World Cup squads
Squads